Steep Island, also known as Ching Chau is a small uninhabited island of Hong Kong, located off the eastern coast of Clear Water Bay Peninsula. Administratively, it is part of Sai Kung District.

See also

 Clear Water Bay

Uninhabited islands of Hong Kong
Sai Kung District
Islands of Hong Kong